The Retroversion of the sovereignty to the people, which challenged the legitimacy of the colonial authorities, was the principle underlying the self-government temporarily in the absence of the legitimate king.

But, in both Spain and Spanish America, this principle was replaced by the concept of popular sovereignty, currently expressed in most constitutional systems throughout the world, whereby the people delegate governmental functions in their leaders and retaining the sovereignty. This was the principle underlying the Spanish American Independence processes

Historical development 

In 1808, the Spanish King Ferdinand VII had been imprisoned by the Napoleonic Empire and subsequently replaced by Joseph Bonaparte. The Seven-Part Code recognized the right of "good and honest" persons to form Juntas in absence of the king. In Spain, resistant governing juntas were formed, claiming sovereignty in the absence of the legitimate King. Following the 1810 disbanding of the central governing Supreme Central and Governing Junta of the Kingdom, Spanish American peoples assumed, in turn, their right to appoint new local authorities, and recovered the tradition of the open cabildos. But the Seven-Part Code implied that the territory was still under the sovereignty of the King and that the Juntas were only a temporary fix. The principle of retroversion of sovereignty added the twist that, in such a case, sovereignty would return to the peoples, who would have a right to reject the authority of the king and appoint new authorities.

The principle of retroversion of sovereignty was premised on the basis that the Spanish territories in America were a personal possession of the king of Spain, and not a colony of Spain. Only the king could rule over them, either directly or through viceroys appointed by himself. This principle already existed, and justified the fact that Spain and Spanish America had different laws. Scholars of the Laws of the Indies had argued that they were two different realms, united under one same crown.

With the kidnapping, Abdications of Bayonne and imprisonment of Ferdinand VII by Napoleon during the Peninsular war and the absence of a legitimate successor, the criterion was used to justify self-government in Spain. But the Junta of Seville had no authority to send or appoint viceroys in America, and Americans had instead the same rights as Spaniards to govern themselves as the rightful king was absent. The principle was employed by many independentist movements in South America of that time, such as the Chuquisaca Revolution or the May Revolution.

The American new entities also adopted the principle of consentimiento (of consent). This meant that they felt free to reject any decision they had been taken without their consent.

See also

 Open cabildo
 School of Salamanca
 Francisco Suárez

Footnotes

Political theories
Spanish American wars of independence
Viceroyalty of the Río de la Plata
Popular sovereignty